Rock Hudson is a 1990 American biographical drama television film directed by John Nicolella and written by Dennis Turner. The film is based on My Husband, Rock Hudson, a 1987 autobiography by Phyllis Gates, actor Rock Hudson's wife (1955–1958). It is the story of their marriage, written after Hudson's 1985 death from AIDS. In the book Gates wrote that she was in love with Hudson and that she did not know Hudson was gay when they married, and was not complicit in his deception. The movie is also based on magazine articles, interviews and court records, including transcripts of the Los Angeles Superior Court trial after which Marc Christian won a large settlement ($21.75 million) from the actor's estate because Hudson had hidden from him the fact that he was suffering from AIDS.  Later, Marc Miller (Hudson's secretary) accused the movie of malicious lies. In April 1989, the court award to Christian was reduced to $5.5 million.

In 1989, both ABC and NBC started developing plans for a biography of Hudson, NBC had announced it had commissioned a script, but ABC had already completed a movie. It aired on ABC on January 8, 1990. NBC later decided not to complete its four-hour miniseries.

A relative unknown, Thomas Ian Griffith, was chosen to portray the actor; he is 6 feet 5 inches tall and Hudson was 6 feet 4 inches. He had to spend up to four hours in makeup to portray the older Hudson.

The movie was reviewed badly by many critics, attracted only 24% of the viewing audience and suffered some advertiser defections because of concern over the depiction of Hudson's homosexuality. It placed 29th in the Nielsen ratings for the week ending January 14, 1990.

Robert Iger claimed that research showed that ABC lost $1 million in advertising due to the broadcast of the film.

Plot
The story begins at the conclusion of the Marc Christian trial, former lover of the deceased Rock Hudson, then flashes back to cover Hudson's life and career.

Truck driver Roy Fitzgerald walks into talent manager Henry Willson's office, wanting to be a movie star. Willson gets the newly named "Rock Hudson" a one-line role in a war film (1948's Fighter Squadron), which takes him 38 times to get right. His mother, Kay, is not impressed about his new career.

On a film set, Hudson meets Tim Murphy and they start a relationship, eventually moving in together. Willson is alarmed by this and urges Hudson to meet his new secretary, Phyllis Gates. The two fall in love, much to Tim's heartbreak. Tim moves out, and soon Rock and Phyllis marry. While in this new relationship, Rock still visits gay bars. Phyllis is shocked and they later divorce and he then fires Willson as his manager.

Hudson's career begins to decline. On the set of the 1966 film Seconds, where he plays a middle-aged man who underwent radical plastic surgery in an attempt to recapture his lost youth, he gets upset to the point where he has a breakdown. Director John Frankenheimer has to close the set to comfort a crying Hudson. Hudson then meets Marc Christian; they become lovers, but Hudson does not tell him that he has AIDS. Hudson attempts a secret treatment in Paris, but has to cut it short to appear on Dynasty in late 1984.

Later, long time friend Doris Day joins Hudson for a press conference, where the secret and Hudson are outed. Hudson dies of AIDS, and Christian sues Hudson's estate for putting him in danger.

Cast

The film includes archive footage of Doris Day, Rock Hudson, John F. Kennedy, Martin Luther King Jr., James Quinn, and Natalie Wood.

Critical reception
John J. O'Connor of the New York Times said the film was "a sympathetic treatment of the actor's life and career" and "a generally feasible portrait". He also praised Thomas Ian Griffith's performance as Rock Hudson.

"The great flaw in Rock Hudson is the script," stated Rick Aragon of rickstexanreviews.com.

References

External links
 

1990 television films
1990 films
1990 drama films
1990 LGBT-related films
1990s American films
1990s biographical drama films
1990s English-language films
ABC network original films
American biographical drama films
American drama television films
American LGBT-related television films
Biographical films about actors
Biographical films about LGBT people
Biographical television films
Cultural depictions of actors
Films based on autobiographies
Films directed by John Nicolella
Films scored by Paul Chihara
Films set in 1947
Films set in 1954
Films set in 1966
Films set in 1984
Films set in 1985
Films set in 1989
Films set in Los Angeles
Gay-related films
HIV/AIDS in American films
HIV/AIDS in television
LGBT-related drama films
Television films based on books
Warner Bros. films